Mark Lewis (March 1889 – August 1968) was a Welsh international rugby union wing who played club rugby for Treorchy and Llwynypia and international rugby for Wales.

Rugby history
Lewis was born in Pontypridd in 1889, and found work as a coal miner in the Rhondda Valleys and spent his working life at the Archibald Hood's Scotch Mine in Llwynypia. He joined Treorchy RFC, but by 1913 he was playing for Llwynypia. Lewis won just one international cap for Wales, chosen for the 1913 Five Nations Championship after Billy Geen dropped out through injury. Lewis was brought into the Welsh squad to face France, played away at Parc des Princes, in a close game which saw Wales win 11-8.

Lewis was replaced the next match, and never represented Wales again.

International matches played
Wales
 1913

Bibliography

References 

1889 births
1968 deaths
Llwynypia RFC players
Rugby union players from Pontypridd
Rugby union wings
Treorchy RFC players
Wales international rugby union players
Welsh miners
Welsh rugby union players